The Fiat 522 is a passenger car produced by Fiat between 1931 and 1933. The 522 was offered in three different body styles : 522C (SWB), 522L (LWB) and 522S (Sport).

The car also featured a four-speed all-synchromesh transmission, which set this Fiat ahead of its time.

The 522 was the first model to feature Fiat's subsequently familiar rectangular logo: the badge used here employed gold lettering on a red background.

Almost 6,000 examples of the 522 were produced. A Fiat 522 CSS was also offered: in this version, the car had a higher compression ratio and twin carburetors.

References
Fiat Personenwagen, by Fred Steiningen, 1994. 

522
Cars introduced in 1931